The Interdisciplinary Regional Museum of Messina (Italian - Museo regionale interdisciplinare di Messina) is a museum of painting, sculpture and archaeology in the city of Messina. Until 2017 it was housed in the former Barbera-Mellinghoff silk-mill, a late 19th century building chosen for it after the 1908 Messina earthquake. Since 2017 it has been housed in a nearby complex designed in the 1970s.

History

Origins

The first nucleus for the museum's collection came with various private collections of conservative taste. First opened in 1806 as the Museo civico peloritano by the Reale Accademia Peloritana "to end the despoliation of art", its formation was the idea of its first director Carmelo La Farina. It housed the Alojsio, Arenaprimo, Ciancialo, Grosso-Cacopardo and Carmisino family collections as well as a collection of 14th to 18th century paintings owned by the city's senate, which also part-funded its running costs.

It was initially based on via Rovere, near the Archivio degli atti notarili, before being moved to former university buildings, then (after its massive expansion from the collections of religious corporations suppressed by the 1866 liquidation laws) in 1884 to a building on via Peculio Frumentario and from 1891 to 1908 to the former monastery of San Gregorio.

Earthquake and recovery
The rebuilding plans were cut short by the 1908 earthquake, in which the museum collapsed and some artworks were lost.

Nationalisation

1939 plan

Post-war restoration

1956 and 1961 plans

1960s plans

1970s plans

In 1977 responsibility for the museum passed to the Regione Siciliana and it took on its present name. In 1984 it was rearranged chronologically.

Basile-Manganaro plan

Completion

Collections
The museum illustrates the course of figurative art in Messina from the 12th to 18th centuries, including paintings, sculptures and decorative art in chronological sequence. Their artists include Antonello da Messina, Mattia Preti, Caravaggio, Girolamo Alibrandi, Vincenzo Catena, Annibale Carracci and Francesco Laurana.

From the precious cathedral treasury come the 'flowering branch' in gold, enamel, pearls and emeralds from a late 17th century goldsmith in the city, though only the early 14th and 17th century Sicilian jewels from the two crowns of the sacred images are displayed.

Marble work

Inlays

Woodwork

Church furniture

Paintings 
Caravaggio

 Adoration of the Shepherds
 Raising of Lazarus

Antonello da Messina

 San Gregorio Altarpiece
 Madonna and Child with a Franciscan

Colijn de Coter

 Deposition

Mattia Preti

 Madonna of the Letter

Mario Minniti

 The Widow of Nain
 Beheading of St John the Baptist
 Circumcision of Christ
 Madonna of the Rosary

Antonello de Saliba

 Madonna with Jasmine
 St Dominica
 St Catherine of Alexandria

Girolamo Alibrandi

 Last Judgement

Alessandro Allori

 Madonna dell'Itria (Our Lady of the Way)

Letterio Subba

The Goddess Calypso Welcoming Telemachus

Cupid and Psyche

Orion, Founder of Messina 
The Nymphs Lapizia and Fetusa Receiving the First Hare Killed by Orion

Foundation of the Compagnia dei verdi

L'Addolorata

Mary Magdalene at Christ's Feet

Nativity of the Virgin

Embassy of the citizens of Messina to the Virgin Mary

Matthias Stomer

Mucius Scaevola in the Presence of Lars Porsena

Adoration of the Shepherds

Sculptures
Antonello Gagini

 Aedicula
 Madonna and Child
 Madonna of the Angels

Giovanni Angelo Montorsoli

 Holy Trinity
 Fontana del Nettuno (original)

Francesco Laurana

 Madonna and Child

Goro di Gregorio

 Madonna degli Storpi (Madonna of the Cripples)

Rinaldo Bonanno

 Marchesi-Barresi funerary monument

Antonello Freri

 Balsamo monument

Martino Montanini

Victory or Peace and Bravery

References

External links
 

Buildings and structures in Messina
Archaeological museums in Italy
Art museums and galleries in Sicily